Clarence Hovermale House, also known as Hovermale-Mendenhall House and most recently the Mendenhall 1884 Inn, is a historic home located at Berkeley Springs, Morgan County, West Virginia.  It was built in 1884, and is a two-story, brick Queen Anne style dwelling that follows a modified, ell-shaped "I"-house plan. Also on the property is a shed, built about 1860.

It was listed on the National Register of Historic Places in 2003.  It is located within the Town of Bath Historic District, listed on the National Register of Historic Places in 2009.

References

Bath (Berkeley Springs), West Virginia
Houses on the National Register of Historic Places in West Virginia
Queen Anne architecture in West Virginia
Houses completed in 1884
Houses in Morgan County, West Virginia
National Register of Historic Places in Morgan County, West Virginia
Individually listed contributing properties to historic districts on the National Register in West Virginia